David Fairchild Weeks (July 31, 1874 – March 15, 1929) was an American football player, coach, and doctor.  He was the first head football coach at Massachusetts Agricultural College—now the University of Massachusetts Amherst, holding the position for one season, in 1898, and compiling a record of 1–4–1. Weeks graduated in 1897 from the University of Pennsylvania and played quarterback for the Penn Quakers football team.

Weeks was born in 1874 to Henry Martin Weeks, a doctor, and Mary Malvina Fairchild Weeks. He married Maude Adele Clampitt in Pennsylvania in 1902.

Weeks later practiced medicine after his graduation from Penn, briefly in Pennsylvania and his home state of New Jersey. Weeks also was involved in the research of nervous system and mental illnesses, (primarily epilepsy) also serving as Superintendent and Medical Director of the New Jersey State Village for Epileptics at Skillman, New Jersey from December 1907 until his sudden death from heart disease in 1929.

He is buried in Blawenburg Reformed Church Cemetery in Somerset County, New Jersey.

Head coaching record

References

External links
 

1874 births
1929 deaths
19th-century players of American football
American football quarterbacks
Penn Quakers football players
UMass Minutemen football coaches
Players of American football from Newark, New Jersey
Physicians from Newark, New Jersey
Physicians from Pennsylvania